Dadadon is an extinct genus of traversodontid cynodonts which existed in Madagascar during the late Middle Triassic. The only species in the genus is Dadadon isaloi.

References

Traversodontids
Prehistoric cynodont genera
Prehistoric animals of Madagascar
Triassic Madagascar
Middle Triassic synapsids of Africa
Fossil taxa described in 2000